Ardal (also romanized as Ardel) is a city in the Central District of Ardal County, Chaharmahal and Bakhtiari province, Iran, and serves as capital of the county. At the 2006 census, its population was 8,162 in 1,767 households. The following census in 2011 counted 8,992 people in 2,025 households. The latest census in 2016 showed a population of 10,113 people in 2,642 households. The city is populated by Lurs.

References 

Ardal County

Cities in Chaharmahal and Bakhtiari Province

Populated places in Chaharmahal and Bakhtiari Province

Populated places in Ardal County

Luri settlements in Chaharmahal and Bakhtiari Province